The 2002 Minnesota Twins season  was the 42nd season for the Minnesota Twins franchise in the Twin Cities of Minnesota, their 21st season at the Hubert H. Humphrey Metrodome and the 102nd overall in the American League. After nearly folding as part of the 2001 Major League Baseball contraction plan, and coming out of a second-place finish in the AL Central with a pitching staff with only two players with an ERA under 4.00, they still won their division and made it to the 2002 American League Championship Series (ALCS) with the youngest team in the league, and with a new manager, Ron Gardenhire. The Twins had a solid first half of the season (45–36), but had a better second half (49–31), which led them to being the division champions. This was the Twins' last season with David Ortiz, as he left the Twins for the Red Sox after the 2002 season.

New Alternate Logos

For the 2002 season, the Twins adopted a secondary logo based on those used from 1970 to 1986, with twins (one representing Minneapolis and the other St. Paul) shaking hands while standing by the river which separates the two cities. The logo also features the team's primary logo, replacing the "Win Twins!" baseball used in the 1976–1986 version.

The season also marked the revival of the "TC" cap logo, which had last been used as such in 1986.

Offseason
November 7, 2001: David Lamb was signed by the Twins as a free agent.
January 23, 2002: Mike Jackson was signed by the Twins as a free agent.

Regular season
May 6: The 2002 NCAA National women's hockey champion Minnesota Duluth Bulldogs were recognized by the Minnesota Twins baseball team at the Metrodome in Minneapolis.
June 4: The Twins walloped the hapless Cleveland Indians 23-2, setting a club record for their largest winning margin and tying their record for most RBI with 22.  Pitcher Rick Reed was lifted after seven innings with a 21-run lead. In the game, Luis Rivas scored five times, joining three other Twins who have accomplished that mark before: Rod Carew (1977), Tim Teufel (1983) and Paul Molitor (1996).
The representatives of the Twins in the All-Star Game were closer Eddie Guardado, center fielder Torii Hunter, and catcher A. J. Pierzynski.
October 9: A home attendance record was set when 55,990 watched the Twins lose to the Anaheim Angels in the second game of the American League Championship Series.
The Twins made just 74 errors this season, their best-ever showing in the field.  The worst season was the inaugural campaign of 1961, when they committed 174 errors.
Jacque Jones had 11 lead-off home runs this season, the second-best season total in American League history, trailing just Brady Anderson's 12 in 1996.
The highest paid Twin in 2002 was Brad Radke at $8,750,000; followed by Rick Reed at $7,000,000.
October 28: Pitcher Michael Jackson was granted free agency, and would later sign with the Arizona Diamondbacks. This season he wore number '42', being grandfathered in after Major League Baseball retired the number league-wide in 1997 to honor pioneer Jackie Robinson.  Players wearing the number at that time were allowed to continue.  Jackson was the last Minnesota Twin to wear the number '42'. 
Bert Blyleven and Tom Kelly were inducted into the Twins Hall of Fame.

Offense

No player hit 30 home runs or drove in 100 RBIs, but many players enjoyed solid seasons.  Torii Hunter and Jacque Jones hit 29 and 27 home runs, respectively, while designated hitter David Ortiz battled injuries and hit 20.  Catcher A. J. Pierzynski had a good year for a catcher, hitting .300.  First baseman Doug Mientkiewicz saw his average drop significantly from the prior year, from .306 to .261.  Third baseman Corey Koskie had a subpar year offensively, shortstop Cristian Guzmán was average, and second baseman Luis Rivas was not strong.  The Twins enjoyed solid production out of the right field spot, whether the position was manned by opening day starter Brian Buchanan, Dustan Mohr, Bobby Kielty, or Michael Cuddyer.

Pitching

The starting rotation resembled a tubercular ward.  Brad Radke, Eric Milton, and Joe Mays suffered serious injuries, requiring Rick Reed to carry the starting rotation.  He was able to fulfill this role, going 9-2 in the second half.  For inexplicable reasons, manager Ron Gardenhire resisted putting Johan Santana into the starter role until he was forced to by injuries.  Santana started only 14 games, but quickly established himself as a dominant starting pitcher, posting an 8-6 record, 2.99 ERA, and a team-leading 137 strikeouts.  Kyle Lohse enjoyed his only solid year as a starter, going 13-8 with a 4.23 ERA.  Matt Kinney also made 12 starts.  Eddie Guardado excelled in his first full year as the team's closer, earning 45 saves, while J. C. Romero, LaTroy Hawkins, and Mike Jackson had strong years as set-up men.  Tony Fiore had a bafflingly strong year out of the bullpen, going 10-3 with an ERA of 3.16.

Defense

A. J. Pierzynski was the team's all-star starting catcher, backed up by Tom Prince.  Doug Mientkiewicz followed up his Gold Glove year with another superb year defensively.  Unfortunately, his relatively weak hitting in 2002 may have prevented him from winning a second consecutive Gold Glove award, as it went to John Olerud.  The rest of the infield was defensively solid, with Luis Rivas at second, Cristian Guzmán at short, and Corey Koskie at third.  In the outfield, two-thirds of the "Soul Patrol" remained, with Jacque Jones in left and Torii Hunter in center.  (This would be Hunter's second consecutive Gold Glove year.)  Right field was a question mark, with Brian Buchanan not lasting long after being the opening day right fielder.  The void was filled for most of the season by the platoon of Dustan Mohr and Bobby Kielty, known collectively by fans as "Dusty Kielmohr".  However, Dusty Kielmohr gave way to Michael Cuddyer for the post-season run.

Season standings

American League Wild Card

Record vs. opponents

Notable transactions
April 15, 2002: Mike Trombley was signed by the Twins as a free agent.
June 3, 2002: Mike Trombley was released by the Twins.
June 4, 2002: Jesse Crain was drafted by the Twins in the 2nd round of the 2002 Major League Baseball draft.
June 19, 2002: José Rodríguez was signed as a free agent by the Twins.
July 12, 2002: Brian Buchanan was traded by the Twins to the San Diego Padres for Jason Bartlett.

Roster

Player stats

Batting

Starters by position
Note: Pos = Position; G = Games played; AB = At bats; H = Hits; Avg. = Batting average; HR = Home runs; RBI = Runs batted in

Other batters
Note: G = Games played; AB = At bats; H = Hits; Avg. = Batting average; HR = Home runs; RBI = Runs batted in

Pitching

Starting pitchers
Note: G = Games pitched; IP = Innings pitched; W = Wins; L = Losses; ERA = Earned run average; SO = Strikeouts

Other pitchers
Note: G = Games pitched; IP = Innings pitched; W = Wins; L = Losses; ERA = Earned run average; SO = Strikeouts

Relief pitchers
Note: G = Games pitched; W = Wins; L = Losses; SV = Saves; ERA = Earned run average; SO = Strikeouts

Post Season

The Twins made it to the ALCS, beating the Oakland Athletics in the Divisional series.  They then lost to the eventual World Series Champions, the Anaheim Angels.

Divisional Series

The Twins won Game One at Oakland before losing two straight including one at home.  The Twins rebounded, and won the final two games to win the series and move on to face Anaheim in the ALCS.

Game One
October 1, at Oakland

Game Two

October 2, at Oakland

Game Three
October 4, at Minnesota

Game Four
October 5, at Minnesota

Game Five

October 6, at Oakland

ALCS

The Twins won the first game at home vs. the Angels, before losing the next four in a row, allowing the Angels to move on to the World Series, who won the Series in seven games against the San Francisco Giants.

Game One
October 8, at Minnesota

Game Two
October 9, at Minnesota

Game Three
October 11, at Anaheim

Game Four
October 12, at Anaheim

Game Five
October 13, at Anaheim

October 14: Released Casey Blake.
October 17: Pitcher Jack Cressend selected off waivers by the Cleveland Indians.
November 15: Traded pitcher Matt Kinney and catcher Javier Valentín to the Milwaukee Brewers for minor leaguers Gerry Oakes and Matt Yeatman.
November 22: Signed pitcher Carlos Pulido as a free agent.  Pulido had last played in the majors in 1994 (also for the Twins).
December 16, 2002: Released DH David Ortiz.

Other post-season awards
Calvin R. Griffith Award (Most Valuable Twin) – Torii Hunter
Joseph W. Haynes Award (Twins Pitcher of the Year) – Eddie Guardado
Bill Boni Award (Twins Outstanding Rookie) – Bobby Kielty
Charles O. Johnson Award (Most Improved Twin) – LaTroy Hawkins
Dick Siebert Award (Upper Midwest Player of the Year) – Jarrod Washburn
The above awards are voted on by the Twin Cities chapter of the BBWAA
Carl R. Pohlad Award (Outstanding Community Service) – Brad Radke
Sherry Robertson Award (Twins Outstanding Farm System Position Player) – Lew Ford
Jim Rantz Award (Twins Outstanding Farm System Pitcher) – J. D. Durbin

Farm system 

LEAGUE CHAMPIONS: Edmonton

Sources
2002 Twins schedule with wins, losses, record, and scores Accessed June 20, 2006
2002 Twins Preview, by Adam J. Ulrey Accessed June 20, 2006
2002 Twins roster by Baseball Almanac Accessed June 20, 2006
 2006 Minnesota Twins Record & Information book, pgs 278-280, copyright 2006 by the Minnesota Twins
 2002 Oakland Athletics Roster by Baseball Almanac Accessed June 21, 2006
2002 ALCS at Baseball-Reference.com Accessed June 22, 2006

References

External links
Diamond Mind's Analysis of the Twins' 2002 season
Player stats from www.baseball-reference.com
Team info from www.baseball-almanac.com
Twins history since 2000, from www.mlb.com 
2002 Standings

Minnesota Twins seasons
Minnesota Twins
American League Central champion seasons
2002 in sports in Minnesota